

Events
 Chiaro Davanzati serves as captain of Or San Michele
 Guittone d'Arezzo founds the Neo-Sicilian School based on the Sicilian School under Frederick II (for more detail see sonnet)

Births
 Zhu Derun (died 1365), Chinese painter and poet in Yuan Dynasty

Deaths
 Busiri (born 1211), Egyptian poet
 Guittone d'Arezzo (born 1235), founder of the Tuscan School
 Brunetto Latini (born 1220), Florentine philosopher, poet, scholar and statesman

13th-century poetry
Poetry